Empress Qincheng (欽成皇后) was the concubine of Emperor Shenzong of Song (Zhao Xu) and the mother of Emperor Zhenzong of Song (Zhao Yong).

Life 
She was born in Kaifeng (Present day Kaifeng, Henan Province). Her birth father Cui Jie died young and her mother Li remarried to a man named Zhu Shi'an and she therefore took the surname of Zhu. She later became his adopted daughter.

When she was sixteen years old, she entered the palace as a royal servant. After eight years as a maid, she caught the eye of Emperor Shenzong and was granted the title of Cairen (才人), the year after she was promoted to Jieyu (婕妤) and was further promoted to Zhaorong (昭容). She gave birth to three children: Zhao Yong (the future Emperor Zhenzong), Zhao Si and the Princess Xu Gouchang.

In 1085, her son Emperor Zhenzong ascended to the throne and she was granted the title of Imperial Consort Dowager Shengrui (聖瑞皇太妃). Emperor Zhenzong's legal wife the Empress Xiang was given the rank of Empress Dowager instead.

In 1100, Zhao Yong died without any heirs. The Prime Minister Zhang Dun suggested that Consort Zhu's younger son Zhao Si to inherit the throne but Empress Dowager Xiang, fearful that the Zhu's would have immense power, placed another prince Zhao Ji (Emperor Huizong) on the throne.

Two years later, Consort Zhu died and Emperor Huizong granted her the posthumous title Empress Qincheng (欽成皇后 literally: "The admirable and becoming Empress")

References 

 《宋史》

Concubines
Song dynasty